Audrey Lu (born August 30, 2002) is an American pair skater. With her skating partner, Misha Mitrofanov, she is the 2022 Four Continents champion, 2021 CS Golden Spin of Zagreb champion, 2018 CS U.S. International Classic silver medalist, and 2022 U.S. national bronze medalist.

Personal life
Lu was born on August 30, 2002, in Dallas, Texas. She attended Spring Creek Academy in Plano, Texas. She graduated from Spring Creek Academy as Salutatorian. She is attending University of California, Los Angeles.

Career

Early years
Lu began learning to skate in 2007. She won the 2015 Southwestern Regional Championships. She placed 7th in the juvenile ladies' event at the 2015 U.S. Championships and 6th in the intermediate category at the 2016 U.S. Championships.

2016–2017 season
Lu's pair skating career began when she teamed up with Misha Mitrofanov in May 2016. Making their international debut, the pair placed 12th at an ISU Junior Grand Prix (JGP) event in the Czech Republic in September 2016. Their season came to an end in November, after Mitrofanov dislocated his shoulder at the Midwestern Sectional Championships. He underwent shoulder surgery and resumed training after six months.

2017–2018 season
Lu/Mitrofanov placed 5th at both of their JGP assignments. In January, they won the junior pairs' title at the 2018 U.S. Championships; they ranked first in both segments and outscored the silver medalists by 17.74 points. In March, the pair placed 5th (6th in the short program, 4th in the free skate) at the 2018 World Junior Championships in Sofia, Bulgaria.

2018–2019 season
Making their senior international debut, Lu/Mitrofanov won silver at the 2018 CS U.S. Classic in mid-September, and then placed fifth at the 2018 CS Nebelhorn Trophy. They were invited to two Grand Prix events, the 2018 NHK Trophy and 2018 Internationaux de France, where they placed seventh and sixth, respectively.  Debuting at senior Nationals at the 2019 U.S. Championships, they placed sixth.

2019–2020 season
Lu/Mitrofanov began the season with a fifth-place finish at the 2019 CS U.S. Classic.  On the Grand Prix, they were eighth at the 2019 Rostelecom Cup.  They concluded the season at the 2020 U.S. Championships, where they finished sixth.

2020–2021 season
With the COVID-19 pandemic affecting international travel, Lu/Mitrofanov were assigned to attend the 2020 Skate America, the Grand Prix having been arranged primarily based on training location.  They placed third in the short program.  Coming fourth in the free skate, their lead from the short program was nevertheless enough to remain in third place overall, winning their first Grand Prix medal as bronze medalists.

Competing at the 2021 U.S. Championships, Lu/Mitrofanov placed third in the short program with a clean skate. They were fourth in the free skate, placing fourth overall and winning the pewter medal.

2021–2022 season
After beginning the season with some minor America competitions, Lu/Mitrofanov competed on the Grand Prix at the 2021 NHK Trophy, finishing in fifth place. They went on to finish in fourth at the 2021 Rostelecom Cup.  They next competed at the 2021 CS Golden Spin of Zagreb, where they won the gold medal, their first Challenger title.

Lu/Mitrofanov won the bronze medal at the 2022 U.S. Championships. Mitrofanov said they were "very happy and grateful" for the event and its large audience. As a result of their placement, they were assigned to compete at the 2022 Four Continents Championships in Tallinn, and named as alternates to the American Olympic team. Lu/Mitrofanov won both segments of the Four Continents competition to take the gold medal.

In March, the cast list for the ice show An Evening with Champions was announced, announcing Audrey Lu skating a solo.

In July, Audrey Lu represented UCLA as a single skater at the 2022 U.S. Collegiate Championships and Invitational U.S. Collegiate Figure Skating Championships and won the silver medal.

Programs
(with Mitrofanov)

Competitive highlights 
GP: Grand Prix; CS: Challenger Series; JGP: Junior Grand Prix. Pewter medals (4th place) awarded only at U.S. national, sectional, and regional events.

Pairs with Mitrofanov

Ladies' singles

References

External links 
 

2002 births
American female pair skaters
Living people
Sportspeople from Dallas
21st-century American women